The Fire Raisers is a 1934 British drama film directed by Michael Powell. It was described by Powell as "a sort of Warner Brothers newspaper headline story;" and marked the first of his four films with actor Leslie Banks.

Plot
Jim Bronson is an insurance investigator, but he's unhappy with his work and gets involved with a gang of arsonists. His conscience is troubling him ...

Cast
 Leslie Banks as Jim Bronson
 Anne Grey as Arden Brent
 Carol Goodner as Helen Vaughan
 Frank Cellier as Brent
 Francis L. Sullivan as Stedding
 Lawrence Anderson as Twist
 Harry Caine as Bates
 Joyce Kirby as Polly

DVD
The film has been released on Region 2 DVD by Opening in the "Les films de ma vie" series. The DVD has fixed French subtitles for the original English soundtrack.

References

Notes

Bibliography

 Chibnal, Steve. Quota Quickies : The Birth of the British 'B' Film. London: BFI, 2007. 
 Powell, Michael. A Life in Movies: An Autobiography. London: Heinemann, 1986. .

External links

The Fire Raisers reviews and articles at the Powell & Pressburger Pages

1934 films
Films directed by Michael Powell
Films by Powell and Pressburger
British crime thriller films
1930s crime thriller films
British black-and-white films
1930s English-language films
1930s British films